Richard Sprigg Canby (September 30, 1808 – July 27, 1895) was a U.S. Representative from Ohio.

Born in Lebanon, Ohio, Canby completed preparatory studies.
He attended Miami University, Oxford, Ohio, from 1826 to 1828.
He engaged in mercantile pursuits and while thus employed studied law.
He was admitted to the bar about 1840 and commenced practice in Bellefontaine, Ohio.
He served as member of the State house of representatives in 1845 and 1846.

Canby was elected as a Whig to the Thirtieth Congress (March 4, 1847 – March 3, 1849).
He engaged in agricultural pursuits.
Upon its formation in 1856 affiliated with the Republican Party.
He moved to Olney, Illinois, in 1863, where he resumed the practice of law.

Canby was elected judge of the second judicial circuit court of Illinois in 1867 and served for several years.
He again resumed the practice of his profession in Olney.
Discontinued active business pursuits in 1882, and lived in retirement until his death.
He died in Olney, Illinois, July 27, 1895.
He was interred in Haven Hill Cemetery.

Sources

1808 births
1895 deaths
People from Lebanon, Ohio
Miami University alumni
People from Bellefontaine, Ohio
Whig Party members of the United States House of Representatives from Ohio
19th-century American politicians
People from Olney, Illinois